Statia Terminal was a Statia association football club based in Oranjestad. The club finished third in the final season and in the 1984 season of the Sint Eustatius League.

References 

Football clubs in Sint Eustatius
1980s disestablishments in the Netherlands Antilles